Muriel June Mellon (June 14, 1928 – August 23, 1966) was an American competition swimmer who represented the United States at the 1948 Summer Olympics in London.  She competed in the women's 100-meter backstroke, and finished seventh in the event final with a time of 1:19.0.

References

1928 births
1966 deaths
American female breaststroke swimmers
Olympic swimmers of the United States
Swimmers from San Diego
Swimmers at the 1948 Summer Olympics
20th-century American women